Leechleaf delissea is a common name for several plants and may refer to:

 Delissea rhytidosperma